Hax or HAX may refer to:

People 
 Carolyn Hax (born 1966), American advice columnist
 Georg Hax (1870–1952), German water polo player
 Heinrich Hax (1900–1969), German modern pentathlete and sport shooter and Iron Cross recipient
 Mike Hax (born 1970), German judoka

Other uses 
 HAX Accelerator, a seed accelerator in Shenzhen, China
 hax, ISO 639-3 code of the Southern Haida language, spoken in Canada and the United States
 HAX, IATA airport code and FALL location identifier Hatbox Field, a closed airfield in Muskogee, Oklahoma, United States

See also
 Hacks (disambiguation)